A wigwam is a single-room Native American dwelling.

Wigwam or The Wigwam may also refer to:

Places
 Wigwam (Chicago), the 1860 National Republican Convention Headquarters in Chicago, Illinois
 Wigwam (Chula, Virginia), a historic home near Chula, Amelia County, Virginia
 Wigwam (DuBois, Pennsylvania), the family home of Major Israel McCreight in Du Bois, Clearfield County, Pennsylvania
 Wigwam, Colorado, an unincorporated community in El Paso County, Colorado
 The Wigwam (Litchfield Park, Arizona) a 1929-built hotel on the National Registry of the Historic Hotels of America
 Wigwam Inn, an outstation and former resort and fishing lodge at the Indian Arm fjord in Vancouver, British Columbia, Canada
 Wigwam River, a tributary of the Elk River that flows through Montana, USA and British Columbia, Canada
 Anderson High School Wigwam, an indoor arena in Anderson, Indiana, USA
 Paddy's Wigwam, a nickname for Liverpool Metropolitan Cathedral in Liverpool, Merseyside, England
 The Wigwam, a nickname for Braves Field, Boston, Massachusetts
 The Wigwam, a nickname for Jacobs Field, Cleveland, Ohio
 The Wigwam, former name of the National Union Convention in Philadelphia, Pennsylvania, USA
 Wigwam Point, location of the Annisquam Harbor Light in the Annisquam neighborhood of Gloucester, Massachusetts, USA

Companies and brands
 Wigwam Hotel (also The Wigwam or Wigwam Resort), in Litchfield Park, Arizona
 Wigwam Mills, a manufacturer of socks & headwear
 Wigwam Motel, Route 66 landmarks
 Wigwam Stores Inc., a defunct department store chain

Music

Bands
 WigWam (duo), a 2006 British duo as a collaboration between Betty Boo and Alex James
 Wigwam (Finnish band), a Finnish progressive rock band active from 1968 onwards
 Wig Wam, a Norwegian retro glam metal band founded in 2001

Songs
 "Wigwam" (Bob Dylan song), a song by Bob Dylan from the 1970 studio album Self Portrait
 "Wigwam", a song by Sonny Stitt and Eddie "Lockjaw" Davis from the 1955 album Jazz at the Hi-Hat
 "Wigwam", a song by Chick Corea from the 1999 album Change
 "Wigwam", a song by Beady Eye from the 2011 album Different Gear, Still Speeding

Other
 Operation Wigwam, an underwater nuclear bomb test
 The Wigwam, c. 1847 burletta by Shirley Brooks
 Wigwam, a local lodge of the Improved Order of Red Men
 Wigwam burner, a wood waste burner

See also
 
 
 Tipi, the portable home of the Plains Indians
 Wig (disambiguation)
 Wam (disambiguation)